In computer networking, if the network is bisected into two equal-sized partitions, the bisection bandwidth of a network topology is the bandwidth available between the two partitions. Bisection should be done in such a way that the bandwidth between two partitions is minimum. Bisection bandwidth gives the true bandwidth available in the entire system. Bisection bandwidth accounts for the bottleneck bandwidth of the entire network. Therefore bisection bandwidth represents bandwidth characteristics of the network better than any other metric.

Bisection bandwidth calculations 
For a linear array with n nodes bisection bandwidth is one link bandwidth. For linear array only one link needs to be broken to bisect the network into two partitions. 

For ring topology with n nodes two links should be broken to bisect the network, so bisection bandwidth becomes bandwidth of two links. 

For tree topology with n nodes can be bisected at the root by breaking one link, so bisection bandwidth is one link bandwidth.

For Mesh topology with n nodes,  links should be broken to bisect the network, so bisection bandwidth is bandwidth of   links.

For Hyper-cube topology with n nodes, n/2 links should be broken to bisect the network, so bisection bandwidth is bandwidth of n/2 links.

Significance of bisection bandwidth 
Theoretical support for the importance of this measure of network performance was developed in the PhD research of Clark Thomborson (formerly Clark Thompson).  Thomborson proved that important algorithms for sorting, Fast Fourier transformation, and matrix-matrix multiplication become communication-limited—as opposed to CPU-limited or memory-limited—on computers with insufficient bisection width.  F. Thomson Leighton's PhD research tightened Thomborson's loose bound  on the bisection width of a computationally-important variant of the De Bruijn graph known as the shuffle-exchange network. Based on Bill Dally's analysis of latency, average case throughput, and hot-spot throughput of m-ary n-cube networks for various m, It can be observed that low-dimensional networks, in comparison to high-dimensional networks (e.g., binary n-cubes) with the same bisection width (e.g., tori), have reduced latency and higher hot-spot throughput.

References

Information theory
Network management